Alexandra Blanca Vela Puga is an Ecuadorian lawyer and politician originally from El Salvador.

Biography
Alexandra Vela was born to Ecuadorian parents in El Salvador. She studied law at the University of Lima and the Catholic University of Santiago de Guayaquil. In 1997, she became one of the founding members of the Ecuadorian Christian Democratic Union. Vera became the Chief of staff of Jaime Roldós Aguilera in 1978, holding this position until Roldós's death in 1981, and then served as Undersecretary of Public Administration to Osvaldo Hurtado until the end of his presidency.

Later, she was elected to the National Congress of Ecuador to represent the CDU and the province of Pichincha. In this period, she sued then president Abdalá Bucaram for defamation after he accused Vera of having stolen documents important to the investigation of the death of former president Jaime Roldós Aguilera. The Supreme Court of Ecuador ruled in favor of Vera in 1998 and sentenced Bucaram to two years in prison, but he had by this time already fled to asylum in Panama.

From 1997 to 1998, Vera served as the Vice President of the National Congress.

After the demise of the government of Jamil Mahuad and the disintegration of the CDU bloc in the National Congress, Vela became part of Osvaldo Hurtado's Solidarity Fatherland Movement.

She joined the Cabinet of Guillermo Lasso as Interior Minister in 2021.

Citations

Sources

External links
 

Members of the National Congress (Ecuador)
Women government ministers of Ecuador
Christian Democratic Union (Ecuador) politicians
University of Lima alumni
Universidad Católica de Santiago de Guayaquil alumni
Living people
Year of birth missing (living people)
Female interior ministers
Ecuadorian Ministers of the Interior
21st-century Ecuadorian women politicians
21st-century Ecuadorian politicians